Buckskin may refer to:


Leather
Buckskin (leather), leather made of buck (i.e. deer) hide
Buckskins, an outfit of buckskin leather

Horses
Buckskin (horse), a body color of horses similar to buckskin leather, the animals also have a black mane and tail
Buckskin (racehorse)

Places
 Buckskin, Indiana
Buckskin Mountains (Arizona) of Arizona
Buckskin Mountains (Arizona-Utah), on the Arizona-Utah border

Entertainment
Buckskin (TV series), an American Western television series 
Buckskin (film), a 1968 Western film

People
Buckskin Frank Leslie (born 1842), American con-man
Peter Buckskin, a member of the SAG group of the Indigenous voice to government in Australia

Other

Buckskinning, a branch of historical re-enactment concentrating on the fur trade period of the Old West community in the United States

See also
Buckskin Joe, a theme park used as a western movie set between 1957 and 2010